The 1900 International Lawn Tennis Challenge was the first edition of what is now known as the Davis Cup.

History
The tournament was conceived in 1899 by four members of the Harvard University tennis team who came up with the idea of challenging the British to a tennis competition. Once the idea received the go-ahead from the United States Lawn Tennis Association and the British Lawn Tennis Association, Dwight F. Davis, one of the four Harvard players, designed a tournament format and spent money from his own pocket to purchase an appropriate sterling silver trophy from Shreve, Crump & Low. The first match between the United States and the British Isles was held at the Longwood Cricket Club in Boston, Massachusetts in 1900. The American team, of which Davis was a part, won the first three matches and the Challenge.

Teams

United States
 Dwight Davis: A left-hander who possessed the twist serve, backing this up with steady ground strokes and volleys. In 1899, Davis won the Intercollegiate and US National Doubles Championships with Ward.
 Holcombe Ward: A right-hander and credited with originating the twist serve. He won the Intercollegiate and US National Doubles Championships with Davis in 1899.
 Malcolm Whitman: A right-hander who appeared in the quarterfinals of the 1896 and 1897 US National Championships and won in 1898, defeating Dwight F. Davis in the all-comers final and receiving the title because 1897 champion Robert Wrenn was fighting in the Spanish–American War. Prior to the Challenge he had placed in the U.S. Top 10 three times, and was ranked No. 1 in 1898 and 1899.

British Isles
 Ernest Black
 Arthur Gore: A right-hander who appeared in the semifinals of the 1898 Wimbledon Championships, the Challenge Round of the 1899 Championships – losing to Reginald Doherty – and the all-comers final of the 1900 Championships, losing to Sydney Smith.
 Herbert Roper Barrett: A right-hander who appeared in the semifinals of the 1899 Wimbledon Championships and the quarterfinals of the 1900 Championships. He also teamed with Harold Nisbet to reach the Challenge Round in the doubles at the latter Championships, losing to Laurence and Reginald Doherty.

Result
United States vs. British Isles

References

External links
Davis Cup official website

Davis Cups by year
International Lawn Tennis Challenge
International Lawn Tennis Challenge
1900 in sports in Massachusetts
1900s in Boston
August 1900 sports events
Sports competitions in Boston
Tennis tournaments in Massachusetts